Lipstick Prince is a South Korean beauty show distributed by OnStyle and premiered on December 1, 2016. The show features 7 idols learning about makeup techniques and applying these new skills either on mannequins or celebrity guests. The show hopes to break the stereotype that makeup is only for females and to encourage discussion of cosmetics, makeovers, and beauty among male idols.

Format
A female celebrity guest, or "princess", will talk about what makeup look she'd like to try. The cast members will then learn the makeup style from a professional makeup artist and practice their new skills on mannequins. Thereafter, the idols will apply the makeup to the guest in a tag-team style. The guest will not be able to see what makeup look they have done for her until the end.

Cast
On February 27, a representative from OnStyle announced that Block B's U-Kwon and NCT's Doyoung will be leaving the show. Furthermore, they revealed that VIXX's N and NCT's Johnny will be taking their places in the second season of "Lipstick Prince."

 Main Host
Heechul (Super Junior)
 Prince
Tony An (H.O.T.)
P.O (Block B)
Eunkwang (BtoB)
Shownu (Monsta X)
Rowoon (SF9)
U-Kwon (Block B)
Doyoung (NCT)
N (VIXX)
Johnny (NCT)

List of episodes & guests

Season 1

Season 2

References

South Korean variety television shows
Korean-language television shows
2016 South Korean television series debuts